The 1979 Leicester City Council election took place on 3 May 1979 to elect members of Leicester City Council in England. This was on the same day as the 1979 general election and other local elections.

Summary

|}

References

Leicester
Leicester City Council elections
1970s in Essex